The Vladimir Zhirinovsky 2008 presidential campaign was the election campaign of Liberal Democratic Party leader Vladimir Zhirinovsky in the 2008 election. This was Zhirinovsky's fourth campaign for the Russian presidency, as he had previously run in the 1991, 1996, and 2000 elections.

Campaigning 
During the campaign Zhirinovsky released a video in which he fired a rifle at targets bearing the faces of his opponents.

Zhirinovsky generated controversy on the campaign trail by espousing severe and ludicrous proposals. For instance,  he suggested that Russia should drop nuclear bombs into the Atlantic in order to create a tsunami that would flood Great Britain.

Rather than distancing himself from the scandal-ridden LDPR party member Andrey Lugovoy, who was wanted by Scotland Yard for murder, Zhirinovsky intentionally sought to be photographed beside him.

Platform 

Zhirinovsky took rather extreme positions on many issues. For instance, he proposed a locking down and closing all of Russia's borders immediately after the election. He declared, "If you think that these are the actions of a police state, well, be my guest. I promise that I will take these actions."

See also 
Vladimir Zhirinovsky 1991 presidential campaign
Vladimir Zhirinovsky 1996 presidential campaign
Vladimir Zhirinovsky 2000 presidential campaign
Vladimir Zhirinovsky 2012 presidential campaign
Vladimir Zhirinovsky 2018 presidential campaign

References 

presidential campaign, 2008
Zhirinovsky